Okeeheelee Park is located in West Palm Beach, Florida, United States. It is managed by the Palm Beach County Parks and Recreation Department. The original site for the park was purchased in 1973, and at the time only about 10% (90 acres) of the area was in its natural state. After 23 years of reclamation, the park was completed in June 1996. Okeeheelee's construction was split into 6 phases, however some did not make it, such as phase 5 which was to be a water park.

The park has amenities for many types of sports, including a 27-hole golf course, with pro shop and clubhouse, baseball fields, tennis courts, and a BMX biking area.

There is both a fitness trail and bike trail that snakes between the lakes, with many pavilions and picnic areas along the way.

The trail includes interpretive signs, trailside benches, and an elevated blind. There is also a Butterfly Garden, and marsh viewing blinds.
Inside are live animal exhibits, interactive displays, and a gift shop.  There are also educational programs for both adults and children.

There is a dog park in Okeeheelee Park called Pooch Pines. There are three areas, two for large dogs, and one for small dogs. The hours are the same as the rest of the park, except it is closed from noon to 3 p.m on Wednesdays for maintenance.

History
Strip mining occurred in the area today occupied by Okeeheelee Park in the 1950s and 1960s. In March 1973, 20 organizations, led by the Palm Beach County Medical Society, proposed using the land for a  nature park. About a month later, the Palm Beach County Board of County Commissioners voted for using  of land – located south of Forest Hill Boulevard, east of Florida's Turnpike, and west of Jog Road – for development of a park. After the private property value was assessed at just over $7 million, the county commission voted in July 1973 to request federal funds to cover approximately half of the price, but the request was denied in October of that year. The county commission later decided to request money from the state of Florida, which granted the request on March 19, 1974. On April 30, the county commission approved of naming the park Okeeheelee Park. "Okeeheelee" is Seminole for "pretty waters".

A dedication ceremony for the park was held on June 15, 1974. Notable guests and participants in the ceremony included Doyle Conner, Florida Commissioner of Agriculture; John Dance, Palm Beach County Parks and Recreation Director; Fred Otis Dickinson, Florida Comptroller; Richard Stone, former Secretary of State of Florida who was elected to the United States Senate that year; Ralph Turlington, Florida Commissioner of Education; and county commissioners Robert Johnson, Lake Lytal, and George Warren. However, development of Okeeheelee Park was slow, with the first phase of the park not completed until March 1982.

Amenities
Amenities at Okeeheelee Park include: baseball fields, softball fields, tennis courts, soccer fields, the nation's leading BMX race track, mountain bike trails (on Pinehurst Road), bicycle paths, a  fitness trail, three 9-hole golf courses, a disc golf course, a dog park, a nature center, an equestrian center with a  trail, a boat launch, water ski lanes, and many picnic pavilions.

Nature Center
The Okeeheelee Nature Center is a little museum of natural Florida. There are aquariums and displays, with many reptiles including: turtles, snakes and alligators. There is a wooden boardwalk/porch that encircles the center, and the whole center is wheelchair-accessible. Nearly three miles of trails run through the adjacent  of woods, past native flora and fauna. The center is open Wednesday - Friday, 1:00PM–4:30PM; Saturday, 10:00AM–4:30PM; It is closed on Monday and Tuesday. The nature trails are open every day from sunrise to sunset.

BMX Race Track
Okeeheelee BMX is one of the nation's top race tracks and BMX race training centers. Sanctioned by USA BMX, conducts twice a week races and daily race training programs for children 2-99. Hours vary daily depending on the programs being offered. Anyone can try a one time, one hour training- for FREE. Class time and availability is on the website www.okeeheeleebmx.com

See also
John Prince Memorial Park - another county park located in central Palm Beach County

References

External links
Map of Okeeheelee Park
Okeeheelee Park web site
Okeeheelee Park Map and Brochure.

Parks in Palm Beach County, Florida
County parks in Florida